The 168th Field Artillery Regiment was a Field Artillery Branch regiment of the Army National Guard.

During World War II the unit was configured under the 75th Field Artillery Brigade with the following units-
 168th Field Artillery (155mm)(Motorized) Battalion Colorado National Guard
 181st Field Artillery (155mm)(Trk Drawn) Battalion Tennessee National Guard
 191st Field Artillery (155mm)(Trk Drawn) Battalion Tennessee National Guard

Colorado unit
The regiment perpetuated the lineage of the 1st Separate Battalion, Field Artillery of the Colorado National Guard, organized on 30 September 1911 at Denver with Batteries A and B. The battalion was eliminated with the two batteries becoming separate units on 20 October 1914. The battalion was formed again by the expansion of the Colorado field artillery units with Batteries A, B, and C on 5 July 1916. It was mustered into federal service at Golden between 4 July and 14 August that year for duty on the Mexican border. After the end of this duty, the battalion was mustered out of federal service on 6 March 1917 at Fort D. A. Russell. The unit returned to federal service on 5 August 1917 during World War I, and was reorganized as the 1st Battalion, 148th Field Artillery of the 41st Division on 19 September 1917.

Demobilized at Fort D. A. Russell on 29 June 1919, the battalion was reorganized in the Colorado National Guard as the 1st Battalion, 158th Field Artillery and federally recognized 9 July 1923 with headquarters at Loveland. It was reorganized and redesignated 1 July 1926 as the 168th Field Artillery Battalion (Horse), becoming the divisional artillery battalion of the 24th Cavalry Division. The 168th Field Artillery Regiment was organized on 1 August 1933 as the divisional artillery regiment of the 24th Cavalry Division with headquarters at Denver. The 1st Battalion was redesignated that day from the 168th Field Artillery Battalion (Horse), and the 2nd Battalion was converted from the 117th Separate Cavalry Squadron. 
 Inducted into federal Service 24 February 1941 at Denver.
The regiment was broken up on 1 March 1943, with 1st Battalion was redesignated as the 168th Field Artillery Battalion, and 2nd Battalion redesignated as the 983rd Field Artillery Battalion. During World War II the 168th Field Artillery Battalion was part of the 75th Field Artillery Brigade.
Inactivated 17 January 1946 at Camp Stoneman, California.

Postwar, the 983rd Field Artillery Battalion was perpetuated by the 193rd Tank Battalion on 10 May 1946. 

The 168th Field Artillery Battalion was reorganized and federally recognized 6 January 1947 with headquarters at Denver.
 Consolidated with the 157th Field Artillery Regiment (United States) 1 February 1959.

Campaign streamers
 World War I
 Champagne-Marne
 Aisne-Marne
 St. Mihiel
 Meuse-Argonne
 Champagne 1918
 World War II
 New Guinea (With Arrowhead)
 Luzon

Decorations
Philippine Presidential Unit Citation, Streamer embroidered 17 OCTOBER 1944 to 4 JULY 1945

Heraldry 
The coat of arms was originally approved for the 168th Field Artillery Battalion on 13 November 1928.  It was amended to correct the blazon of the shield on 19 January 1929.  It was redesignated for the 168th Field Artillery Regiment on 9 January 1943.  The insignia was redesignated for the 168th Field Artillery Battalion on 18 August 1943.  It was rescinded/cancelled on 1 September 1961.  The insignia was reinstated and redesignated for the 168th Regiment on 24 April 1997.  It was amended to correct the blazon of the shield on 17 November 1997.

Nebraska unit 
The 3rd Battalion, 134th Infantry, an element of the 34th Infantry Division (United States), was organized and federally recognized 4 December 1946. Its headquarters was created at North Platte, Nebraska.
It was converted and redesigned 1 March 1959 as the 168th Artillery, consisting of the 1st and 2nd Howitzer Battalions, elements of the 34th Infantry Division. Reorganized 1 April 1963 to consist of the 1st Howitzer Battalion non-divisional, and 2nd Howitzer Battalion, an element of the 67th Infantry Brigade.
Reorganized 1 March 1964 to consist of the 1st Howitzer Battalion non-divisional, and 2nd Howitzer Battalion, and element of the 67th Infantry Brigade.
Reorganized 1 May 1968 to consist of the 1st Battalion, an element of the 67th Infantry Brigade. Reorganized 1 October 1985 to consist of the 1st Battalion, 168th Field Artillery, an element of the 35th Division Artillery, direct support to the 67th Infantry Brigade. Deactivated 4 October 1997.

References

Citations

Bibliography

External links
 CMH Field Artillery lineages 
 http://co.ng.mil/arng/units/rti/default.aspx

Field artillery regiments of the United States Army National Guard
Military units and formations in Colorado
Military units and formations established in 1911